Photinia integrifolia is a species in the family Rosaceae, native to Asia.

References

integrifolia
Trees of China
Flora of tropical Asia